Markus Thorandt (born 1 April 1981) is a German former professional footballer who played as a defender.

Career
Thorandt began his career with TSV Königsbrunn and left the club 1997 to sign with FC Augsburg. After nine years, he left FC Augsburg and signed with TSV 1860 Munich. Here he made his professional debut in the 2. Bundesliga for 1860 Munich on 22 October 2006 in a match against 1. FC Kaiserslautern.

On 18 May 2009, Thorandt signed a three-year contract with FC St. Pauli. During the 2014–15 season, Thorandt suffered a severe injury of his right knee and could only participate in two league matches. Subsequently, he did not receive an extension of his expiring contract and had to leave St. Pauli after six years.

References

External links 
 

1981 births
Living people
Sportspeople from Augsburg
German footballers
Footballers from Bavaria
Association football defenders
FC Augsburg players
TSV 1860 Munich players
FC St. Pauli players
FC St. Pauli II players
Bundesliga players
2. Bundesliga players